The Untamed is a 1920 American silent Western film directed by Emmett J. Flynn and starring Tom Mix, Pauline Starke, and George Siegmann. It was based on a novel of the same name by Max Brand and was remade as a sound film Fair Warning in 1931.

Plot
As described in a film magazine, Whistling Dan (Mix), the adopted son of rancher Joe Cumberland (Barrows), has been raised since childhood with the latter aware of his instinct to fight like an animal and kill that which harms him. Joe has forbidden Dan from frequenting Morgan's Place, a gathering ground of local renegades and desperadoes. Joe then purchases the place with the intent to close it, and on the last day of its activity Dan encounters Jim Silent (Siegmann), an insulting cowboy. When he is left behind following an unfair fight to perish in the building after his enemy has set fire to it, Dan is rescued by his dog and horse. Starting off in pursuit of Jim, Dan is followed by Kate (Starke), his foster sister and sweetheart. Dan comes to doubt Kate after a pair of misrepresenting circumstances. After she falls into traps set by villainous followers of Jim, she escapes with the help of Dan's dog and a member of Jim's gang who has an obligation to Dan for his freedom from arrest. She effects Dan's rescue and restores his faith in her.

Cast

Preservation
A print of The Untamed is in the George Eastman House Motion Picture Collection.

See also
 Tom Mix filmography
 List of Fox Film films

References

Bibliography
 Aubrey Solomon. The Fox Film Corporation, 1915-1935: A History and Filmography. McFarland, 2011.

External links

 
 

1920 films
1920 Western (genre) films
Films based on American novels
Films directed by Emmett J. Flynn
Fox Film films
American black-and-white films
Silent American Western (genre) films
1920s English-language films
1920s American films